Athens – Epidaurus Festival is an annual arts festival that takes place in Athens and Epidaurus, from May to October. It is one of the most famous festivals in Greece. The festival includes musical, theatrical and other cultural events.

History
It was founded in 1955 with actions of Georgios Rallis (then Minister to the Prime Minister). Its purpose was to promote the artistic and theatrical creation. The director Dinos Giannopoulos undertook the organization of the first Athens Festival, on commission by then-Minister of Culture.

Today, the festival is organised by the "Hellenic Festival S.A." company. Between 2016-2019, Vangelis Theodoropoulos is serving as the artistic director following the resignation of Jan Fabre. Since 2019, Katerina Evangelitos has been the festival's Artistic Director.

Notable moments
Over the years, the Athens Festival has been able to host numerous notable groups and artists.,
 1955: the first year of the Festival, Dimitris Mitropoulos and the New York Philharmonic play Nikos Skalkottas' 36 Greek dances.
 1958: The Athens Philharmonic Orchestra with Gina Bachauer.
 1959: The New York Philharmonic directed by Leonard Bernstein.
 1961: Maria Callas performs Norma by Vincenzo Bellini and Médée by Luigi Cherubini.
 1961: The Royal Ballet (Covent Garden) with Margot Fonteyn.
 1962: The Berlin Philharmonic directed by Herbert von Karajan.
 1963: The Ballet of the 20th Century under Maurice Béjart.
 1963: Ballet performance with Rudolf Nureyev and Margot Fonteyn.
 1967: The Los Angeles Philharmonic directed by Zubin Mehta.
 1976: Sviatoslav Richter recital.
 1979: The Alvin Ailey American Dance Theater.
 1981: The Vienna Opera Ball with Rudolf Nureyev.
 1982: Aeschylus' Oresteia, on Epidaurus, under the direction of Peter Hall.
 1982: The Karlsruhe symphony orchestra with Dimitris Sgouros.
 1983: The Martha Graham Dance Company.
 1984: The Ballet National de Marseille under Roland Petit.
 1984: The Zurich Opera with Agnes Baltsa and José Carreras.
 1985: The Royal Opera (Covent Garden).
 1985: The National Symphony Orchestra (Washington) under Mstislav Rostropovich.
 1988: The New York Philharmonic directed by Zubin Mehta.
 1989: Manos Hatzidakis with Nana Mouskouri
 1989: The Royal Danish Ballet.
 1990: The Leningrad Philharmonic Orchestra under Yuri Temirkanov.
 1991: Luciano Pavarotti recital at Odeon of Herodes Atticus.
 1992: Montserrat Caballé recital.
 1993: The Vienna Philharmonic directed by Riccardo Muti.
 1993: José Carreras recital at Odeon of Herodes Atticus and the Ancient Theatre of Epidaurus.

Venues
Odeon of Herodes Atticus
Athens Concert Hall
"Technopolis", Gazi
"Peiraios 260"
"THEATRON", Cultural Center "Hellenic Cosmos"
"Bios"
Benaki Museum Pireos Street Annexe
"Scholeion Theatre", Moschato
Epidaurus Ancient Theatre
Ancient Epidaurus Little Theatre

References

External links
 Official website of Athens & Epidaurus Festival
 Festival description by allaboutfestivals.gr/en/

Festivals in Greece
Festivals established in 1955
Theatre in Greece
Tourist attractions in Athens
Tourist attractions in Peloponnese (region)
Festival
1955 establishments in Greece